The Red Popsicle (also known as Giant Red Twin Popsicle or simply Popsicle) is a 2011 sculpture by Catherine Mayer, installed in Seattle's Belltown neighborhood, in the U.S. state of Washington.

Description and history 
The 17-foot steel and epoxy artwork was installed at the intersection of Fourth and Blanchard outside the building of the same name in early June 2011.

Reception 
Christina Ausley of the Seattle Post-Intelligencer described the sculpture as "public pop art that looks good enough to eat, but sadly is not". The newspaper also included the artwork in a 2021 list of "24 of Seattle's quirkiest landmarks". Bradley Foster included the sculpture in Thrillist's 2014 list of "10 secret Seattle things you didn't know existed". Sean Keeley and Sarah Anne Lloyd included the work in Curbed Seattle 2019 list of "30 notable public art spots in Seattle".

See also 

 2011 in art

References

External links 

 Giant Red Twin Popsicle at Roadside America

2011 establishments in Washington (state)
2011 sculptures
Belltown, Seattle
Outdoor sculptures in Seattle
Steel sculptures in Washington (state)